is a railway station in the city of Sano, Tochigi, Japan, operated by the private railway operator Tōbu Railway. The station is numbered "TI-33".

Lines

Station layout
Sano-shi Station has two opposed side platforms, connected to the station building by an underground passageway.

Platforms

Adjacent stations

History
It was renamed to its present name on 1 April 1943.

From 17 March 2012, station numbering was introduced on all Tōbu lines, with Sanoshi Station becoming "TI-32".

Passenger statistics
In fiscal 2019, the station was used by an average of 696 passengers daily (boarding passengers only).

Surrounding area
 Sano Shichiken-cho Post Office
Sano Cultural Center

See also
 List of railway stations in Japan

References

External links

 Tobu station information 
	

Tobu Sano Line
Stations of Tobu Railway
Railway stations in Tochigi Prefecture
Railway stations in Japan opened in 1914
Sano, Tochigi